Robert Ayres Barnet (September 3, 1853 – June 26, 1933) was an American musical theatre lyricist from New York City, active in New York and Boston in the late 19th and early 20th centuries.

Career
Barnet wrote lyrics for 1492 and Excelsior, Jr. Collaborators included Robert Melville Baker, George Whitefield Chadwick, Edward Warren Corliss, Louis F. Gottschalk, Harry Lawson Heartz, David Kilburn Stevens, Lewis Sabin Thompson, and George Lowell Tracy. He belonged to the Boston Cadets, and contributed to the group's amateur theatricals. For example, his Jack and the Beanstock premiered in 1896 at Boston's Tremont Theatre. It was performed by the "Boston Cadets, who always present Barnet's pieces before they are staged professionally. The new piece is ... a fairy Mother Goose burlesque. The music is by A.B. Sloane.  ... Augustus Pitou, Klaw & Erlanger, E.E. Rice, and other prominent gentlemen" attended. The female impersonator Julian Eltinge appeared in the early shows. Barnet died in New York in 1933.

Images

References

Further reading

 Barnet, Anne Alison. Extravaganza King: Robert Barnet and Boston Musical Theater. Northeastern University Press, Boston: 2004.

External links
 New York Public Library 
 I love you Evaline, words by R.A. Barnet ; music by Geo. L. Tracy; from Excelsior Jr. (Boston: Bates & Bendix, 1895)
 O lovely home, libretto by R.A. Barnet ; music by G.W. Chadwick; from Tabasco, 1894

1853 births
1933 deaths
Musicians from Boston
19th century in Boston
Writers from New York City
Songwriters from Massachusetts
Cultural history of Boston